The Edsel Pacer is an automobile that was produced and sold by Edsel in 1958. The Pacer was based on the shorter narrower Edsel platform, shared with Ford and the Ranger.

Pacer is one of two Edsel model names reused by manufacturers other than Ford, as was Citation.  The Corsair, a 1958-only Edsel model, used a name previously applied to the Henry J by the Kaiser-Frazer Corporation.

The Pacer represented a step up from the basic Ranger model. In addition to the Ranger's base trim appoints, the Pacer received contoured seat backs, nylon upholstery cloth, color-keyed rubber floor mats, and extra stainless steel exterior and interior trim pieces and window moldings. A basic heater (as a US$92 option) and radio (at $95) were available, and air conditioning was optional, as well (at $417). A tachometer was optional.

All Pacers rode on Ford's 118 in (2997 mm) wheelbase and shared the Ranger’s engine choices, with a 303 hp (226 kW)  FE V8 (with four-barrel carburetor) as standard. (The 345 hp (257 kW)  MEL V8, standard in the Corsair and Citation, was not available.) A three-speed manual transmission was also standard.  Buyers also could upgrade to a three-speed automatic transmission with a standard column-mounted gear selector, or choose Edsel’s highly promoted but trouble-prone Teletouch automatic, which placed its drive-selection buttons in the steering wheel hub, as a US$231 option.

While their roll-out was highly publicized in the fall of 1957, Edsels were a marketing disaster for Ford and for Ford's corporate strategy for meeting General Motors product line for product line. Total Pacer output in U.S. and Canada for the model stood at 20,988 units, of which 1,876 were U.S.-built convertibles, 7,141 four-door sedans (6,083 U.S./1,058 Canada), 6,717 hardtop coupes (6,139 U.S./578 Canada), and 5,254 four-door hardtops (4,959 U.S./295 Canada).  Prices for the Pacer ranged from $2,700 to $2,993. Despite being among the best-selling 1958 Edsel models, the Pacer was discontinued at the end of the 1958 model year.  The premium Citation model was also dropped, as was the trouble-prone Teletouch system.

Production figures

Gallery

Different platforms
The model year of Edsel's introduction was a post-WW II high point of sorts for the Ford Motor Company. Three full-size platforms of distinctly different interior widths were in use each by Lincoln, Mercury, and Ford, a situation that lasted until Ford received a much wider platform in 1960. Edsel shared both Mercury's and Ford's platform in 1958, so offers an insight into their differing interior dimensions.

References
 
 
 
 
 Flory,  J. "Kelly", Jr. American Cars 1946-1959. Jefferson, NC:  McFarland & Coy, 2008.
 

Notes

External links

Edsel.com History, specifications, resources for owners.
Smith Motor Company Virtual Edsel Dealer
The International Edsel Club
Edsel.US Restorer's discussion group

Pacer
Coupés
Sedans
Rear-wheel-drive vehicles
Motor vehicles manufactured in the United States
Cars introduced in 1958